Richard W. Fishel (September 19, 1909 – August 12, 1972) was an American football player. 

Fishel was born in New York, New York, in 1909. He played college football as a fullback and quarterback for the Syracuse Orange football teams from 1930 to 1932.

Fishel also played professional football in the National Football League (NFL) as a fullback and wingback for the Brooklyn Dodgers. He appeared in tn NFL games, two as a starter, during the 1933 and 1934 seasons. He had 22 carries for 61 yards and a touchdown. He also completed three of seven passes for 50 yards with one interception. He also played for the Bay Parkway team in 1934.

After his playing career ended, Fishel became a "pioneer in radio and television sports announcing." He later operated an advertising and promotions firm and also served as a director of the North American Hotel Corp. He died in August 1972 at age 52 in Hollywood, Los Angeles, California.

References

1909 births
1972 deaths
American football fullbacks
American football quarterbacks
Brooklyn Dodgers (NFL) players
Syracuse Orange football players
Players of American football from New York City